Rise of Flight: The First Great Air War is  a World War I combat flight simulation video game by Russian developer 777 Studios and released on May 7, 2009.

Gameplay

Development
Rise of Flight premiered at Games Convention 2008 in Leipzig, and at CIS Igromir 2008. Closed beta testing of the game began in April 2008. On May 7, 2009, Rise of Flight was officially released in Russia with Russian publisher ND Games. In the US, Rise of Flight: The First Great Air War was premiered at the 2009 E3 and was officially released on June 25, 2009 in the US by its publisher 777 Studios. Aerosoft gained publishing rights in Europe, with the game also being offered for download from Direct2Drive. In June 2010, 777 Studios acquired the rights to the Rise of Flight brand.

In 2017, IL-2 Sturmovik: Flying Circus, the spiritual successor of Rise of Flight, was announced by 1C Game Studios, a studio which emerged from a partnership with 777 studios. The first volume was released in 2019 and two additional volumes are currently under development.

Reception

Notes

External links

2009 video games
Flight simulation video games
World War I flight simulation video games
Video games developed in Russia
Windows games
Windows-only games
World War I video games